Vlae is a neighbourhood in the City of Skopje, North Macedonia, administered by the Karpoš Municipality.

Demographics
According to the 2002 census, the village had a total of 6809 inhabitants. Ethnic groups in the village include:

Macedonians 6340 
Serbs 249
Albanians 47
Vlachs 40
Turks 11 
Bosniaks 7
Romani 6
Others 109

References

Neighbourhoods in Karpoš Municipality
Neighbourhoods of Skopje